Vatan ("Homeland" or "Motherland") is a Turkish daily newspaper founded in 2002 by the Doğan Media Group. The paper was purchased by DK (Demirören & Karacan) Corporation in April 2011 and was totally acquired by Demirören Holding a few months later.

As of March 2011, Vatan had the 15th highest circulation in Turkey at 111,489. However on 1 November 2018 it ceased publication.

References

External links 
  

2002 establishments in Turkey
2018 disestablishments in Turkey
Newspapers published in Istanbul
Publications established in 2002
Publications disestablished in 2018
Turkish-language newspapers
Daily newspapers published in Turkey